EQS may refer to:

 Etixx-Quick-Step, a professional cycling team
 Mercedes-Benz EQS, an electric sedan
 Mercedes-Benz EQS SUV, an electric sport utility vehicle
 Environmental Quality Standard, an environmental standard for environmental quality
 Esquel Airport (IATA airport code: EQS), Esquel, Chubut Province, Argentina

See also

 EQ (disambiguation)